Muxika is a town and municipality located in the province of Biscay, in the autonomous community of Basque Country, northern Spain. It has a population of 1,465 inhabitants as of 2019 according to the Spanish National Statistics Institute.

References

External links
 MUXIKA in the Bernardo Estornés Lasa - Auñamendi Encyclopedia (Euskomedia Fundazioa) 

Municipalities in Biscay